Sir Oswald Mosley, 2nd Baronet (27 March 1785 – 24 May 1871) was an Anglo-Irish aristocrat, politician, historian and naturalist. He served as High Sheriff of Staffordshire in 1814.

Family
He was the son of Oswald Mosley (17 March 1761 – 27 July 1789), son of Sir John Mosley, 1st Baronet, of Ancoats (1732 - 29 September 1798), created 1st Baronet Mosley, of Ancoats, in the Baronetage of Great Britain, on 8 June 1781, and wife (married 7 April 1760) Elizabeth Bayley (died 15 October 1797), daughter of James Bayley of Withington (1705–1769) and Anne Peploe (1702–1769), daughter of Samuel Peploe. John Mosley, 1st Baronet was the son of Nicholas Mosley (died 1734) and Elizabeth Parker. He had four aunts.

Mosley's family were prosperous landowners in Staffordshire and County Monaghan, Ireland. The family seat was at Rolleston Hall, near Burton upon Trent and he succeeded to the title of 2nd Baronet Mosley, of Ancoats, on 29 September 1798. His uncle Ashton Nicholas Mosley married his mother-in-law Mary Morley and had issue, who succeeded in the House.

Career
He was Member of Parliament (MP) for Portarlington 1806–1807, Winchelsea 1807–1812, Midhurst 1817-1818 and Staffordshire North 1832–1837. He was High Sheriff of Staffordshire 1814.

He wrote a number of local and natural history books, including History of the Castle, Priory and Town of Tutbury (1832), Gleanings in Horticulture (1851) and Natural History of Tutbury (1863).

Marriage and children
He married on 31 January 1804 Sophia Annie Every (died 8 June 1859), daughter of Sir Edward Every, 8th Baronet, of Eggington, and Mary Morley (who married for a fourth time to Ashton Nicholas Mosley), Sophia was the sister of Henry Every who married his aunt Penelope Mosley. They had 13 children:
 Oswald Mosley, born 2 December 1804, died 25 September 1856, married Maria Bradshaw, but died without surviving issue
 Sophia Anne Mosley, born 15 October 1806, died unmarried 29 April 1880
 Emily Mosley, born 8 February 1808, died unmarried 25 December 1880
 Sarah Elizabeth Mosley, born 8 February 1808, died January 1826
 Frances Mosley, born 24 August 1810, died 20 May 1881, married on 9 October 1827 James Heath Leigh of Belmont Hall, Great Budworth, Cheshire (died 5 August 1848), and had 2 daughters and six sons
 Sir Tonman Mosley, 3rd Baronet, of Ancoats (9 July 1813 – 28 April 1890), who succeeded to the title of 3rd Baronet Mosley, of Ancoats, on 24 May 1871, and wife Catherine Wood (died 22 April 1891), daughter of The Reverend John Wood of Swanwick, Derbyshire, and had three sons:
 Sir Oswald Mosley, 4th Baronet, of Ancoats (25 September 1848 – 10 October 1915)
 Tonman Mosley, 1st Baron Anslow (16 January 1850 – 20 August 1933)
 Ernald Mosley (29 October 1851 – 3 September 1933)
 John Mosley, born 15 December 1814, died 14 March 1815
 Mary Anne Mosley, born circa 1816, died 20 December 1890, married on 25 April 1843 Major William Fawkener Chetwynd of Brockton Hall, Staffordshire (15 October 1788 – 25 April 1873), son of Sir George Chetwynd, 1st Baronet, of Brockton Hall, and Jane Bantin, and had two daughters and three sons
 Penelope Mosley, born 9 November 1816, died 28 August 1833
 Caroline Mosley, born 27 July 1818, died 6 May 1862, married on 27 June 1843 Henry Master Feilden (c1818-5 September 1875) and had 4 daughters and one son
 Octavia Mosley, born 14 February 1820, died 1883, married 9 June 1857 Edward Spooner (c1821-c1889)
 Ernald Mosley, born 13 August 1821, died 23 January 1837
 Letitia Mosley, born 27 May 1826, married 1864 John Feild Wright

References

External links
 Sir Oswald Mosley, 2nd Baronet on Staffordshire Past Track
 

1785 births
1871 deaths
18th-century Anglo-Irish people
19th-century Anglo-Irish people
19th-century British historians
19th-century naturalists
Baronets in the Baronetage of Great Britain
High Sheriffs of Staffordshire
Members of the Parliament of the United Kingdom for English constituencies
Members of the Parliament of the United Kingdom for Portarlington
UK MPs 1806–1807
UK MPs 1807–1812
UK MPs 1812–1818
UK MPs 1832–1835
UK MPs 1835–1837
Oswald
Mosley baronets
British naturalists
Local historians